Catellus was a legendary king of the Britons, as recounted in Geoffrey of Monmouth's work Historia Regum Britanniae. According to Geoffrey, he was the son of King Gerennus and was succeeded by his son, Millus. In some versions of the Brut y Brenhinedd, a series of Welsh versions of Geoffrey's Historia, Catellus is succeeded by his son Coel, who is then succeeded by his own son Porrex II.

References

3rd-century BC rulers
Legendary British kings